Joyce de Guatemala Bush Vourvoulias (born Joyce de Guatemala Bush; 25 February 1938- 2000) was a Mexican sculptor and author.

Early life 
Bush Vourvoulias was born in Mexico City to Cassius Albert Bush and Martha Bush, of Guatemalan descent. She died in 2000 after a brain aneurysm. She wrote about her own works and portfolios and focused her art on the environment and people in isolation.

Bush Vourvoulias studied Fine Arts at various institutions around the world, including the University Autonoma de Mexico, University of Wisconsin and Silpakorn University (Bangkok).

Career 
She held Artist-in residency at the Brandywine Workshop in Philadelphia and worked as a cultural specialist multiple times in parts of the world. Her art was displayed in institutions such as the Philadelphia Art Alliance, Institute of Contemporary Art, Latin American Guild arts, Associacion Tikal.

Public works 
 Mayan Game Group- Philadelphia, Pennsylvania 1981
 Circle- Collegeville, Pennsylvania
 Hunters of the Dawn- Philadelphia, Pennsylvania (Temple University)
 House of Knowledge- Cheltenham Library, Pennsylvania

Personal life 
Bush Vourvoulias married Jason Leander Vourvoulias in 1956. The couple had three children, William Craig, Sabrina Maria, and Albert Leander (who started his own art and journalism career). She continued her art after marriage and children. She died in 2000 and her husband passed away shortly thereafter.

Her daughter wrote an article outlining the impact of her work and the impact on her community and the state of Pennsylvania.  After her death, her husband, impacted family and Brandywine created a sponsorship for Latina artists striving for residency. This scholarship is called the Joyce de Guatemala Scholarship Fund. It is meant to achieve Bush Vourvoulias's dream of reaching out to those who have few opportunities to advance their art careers. It offers the opportunity to apply for a sponsored residency, in hopes that they will explore public service following Bush Vourvoulias.

References

1938 births
2000 deaths
Date of death missing
Place of death missing
Artists from Mexico City
Writers from Mexico City
Mexican women sculptors
20th-century Mexican women writers
20th-century Mexican writers
20th-century Mexican women artists
Deaths from intracranial aneurysm